The Capitulation of Linz was an action during the War of the Austrian Succession. 

In January 1742 Austrian field marshal Ludwig Andreas von Khevenhüller successfully recaptured Linz and forced 10,000 French troops to surrender.
Other sources say that the French commander threatened to completely destroy the city, and was allowed to retreat his troops into Bavaria for the return of an intact Linz.

References 

War of the Austrian Succession
1740s conflicts
18th-century conflicts